Marián Bažány (born May 9, 1975) is a Slovakian-born German professional ice hockey defenceman who is currently an Unrestricted Free Agent. He most recently played for Düsseldorfer EG of the Deutsche Eishockey Liga (DEL).

Career statistics

References

External links

1975 births
Living people
DEG Metro Stars players
Düsseldorfer EG players
Étoile Noire de Strasbourg players
German ice hockey defencemen
HC Slovan Bratislava players
Ice hockey people from Bratislava
Slovak expatriate sportspeople in France
Slovak expatriate ice hockey players in Germany
Expatriate ice hockey players in France
Slovak emigrants to Germany
Slovak ice hockey defencemen
Naturalized citizens of Germany